The 2019 Championship League was a professional non-ranking snooker tournament, taking place from   at the Ricoh Arena in Coventry (Group 1–6) and at the Barnsley Metrodome in Barnsley (Group 7 and the Winners' Group), both in England. It was the 12th staging of the tournament.

David Gilbert made the historic 147th maximum break in his group 5 round robin match against Stephen Maguire. It was Gilbert's second professional maximum break (he achieved his first in the 2015 Championship League), and it was the sixth consecutive year that a maximum was made in the Championship League.

During the round robin matches, Neil Robertson recorded his 600th career century in Group 1, and Ding Junhui his 500th in Group 7. And during the Winners' Group round robin matches, John Higgins made his 750th career century break, and Judd Trump also recorded his 600th.

John Higgins was a two-time defending champion, having retained his 2017 title with a 3–2 victory against Zhou Yuelong in the 2018 final. However, Higgins lost 3–0 to Martin Gould in the semi-finals.

Martin Gould went on to win his second Championship League title, beating Jack Lisowski 3–1 in the final.

Tournament Format
The Championship League event sees 25 professionals (including substitutes; 28 players in 2019) take part, with players earning prize money for every frame won. Matches are best of 5 frames, and the league is played from January to March 2019.

The competition runs over eight groups, each consisting of seven players. From each group the top four qualify for a play-off, and the winners of the first seven play-offs qualify for the winners group. The bottom two players of each group are eliminated and the remaining four move to the next group, where they are joined by three more players until the seventh group. The winners play in the final group, and the winner of the Winners' Group play-off takes the title and a place at the 2019 Champion of Champions.

Prize fund 
The breakdown of prize money for the 2019 Championship League is shown below.

Group 1–7
Winner: £3,000
Runner-up: £2,000
Semi-final: £1,000
Frame-win (league stage): £100
Frame-win (play-offs): £300
Highest break: £500
Winners' Group
Winner: £10,000
Runner-up: £5,000
Semi-final: £3,000
Frame-win (league stage): £200
Frame-win (play-offs): £300
Highest break: £1,000

Tournament total: £177,800

Group 1 
Group 1 was played on 1 and 2 January 2019. Neil Robertson was the first player to qualify for the Winners' Group, recording his 600th career century in the round-robin match against Anthony Hamilton.

Matches 

 Neil Robertson 3–1 Jack Lisowski
 Jimmy Robertson 0–3 Robert Milkins
 Anthony Hamilton 3–2 Neil Robertson
 Mark King 3–1 Ricky Walden
 Jack Lisowski 1–3 Jimmy Robertson
 Robert Milkins 2–3 Mark King
 Ricky Walden 3–1 Anthony Hamilton
 Neil Robertson 3–1 Jimmy Robertson
 Jack Lisowski 3–2 Robert Milkins
 Mark King 3–0 Anthony Hamilton
 Ricky Walden 3–0 Robert Milkins
 Jimmy Robertson 1–3 Anthony Hamilton 
 Neil Robertson 1–3 Ricky Walden 
 Jack Lisowski 3–1 Mark King
 Jimmy Robertson 3–0 Ricky Walden
 Robert Milkins 1–3 Anthony Hamilton
 Neil Robertson 3–0 Mark King
 Jack Lisowski 3–2 Anthony Hamilton
 Jimmy Robertson 3–1 Mark King
 Jack Lisowski 3–2 Ricky Walden
 Neil Robertson 3–1 Robert Milkins

Table

Play-offs

Group 2 
Group 2 was played on 3 and 4 January 2019. Jack Lisowski was the second player to qualify for the Winners' Group.

Matches 

 Judd Trump 3–0 Kyren Wilson
 Luca Brecel 3–2 Jimmy Robertson
 Anthony Hamilton 3–0 Judd Trump
 Ricky Walden 2–3 Jack Lisowski
 Kyren Wilson 3–0 Luca Brecel
 Jimmy Robertson 1–3 Ricky Walden
 Jack Lisowski 3–2 Anthony Hamilton
 Judd Trump 1–3 Luca Brecel
 Kyren Wilson 2–3 Jimmy Robertson
 Ricky Walden 3–1 Anthony Hamilton
 Jack Lisowski 1–3 Jimmy Robertson
 Luca Brecel 3–1 Anthony Hamilton
 Judd Trump 1–3 Jack Lisowski
 Kyren Wilson 3–2 Ricky Walden
 Luca Brecel 0–3 Jack Lisowski 
 Jimmy Robertson 3–2 Anthony Hamilton
 Judd Trump 3–2 Ricky Walden
 Kyren Wilson 3–1 Anthony Hamilton
 Luca Brecel 3–0 Ricky Walden
 Kyren Wilson 2–3 Jack Lisowski
 Judd Trump 3–1 Jimmy Robertson

Table

Play-offs

Group 3 
Group 3 was played on 7 and 8 January 2019. Judd Trump was the third player to qualify for the Winners' Group.

Matches 

 Mark Selby 0–3 Barry Hawkins
 Stuart Bingham 2–3 Judd Trump
 Jimmy Robertson 2–3 Mark Selby
 Kyren Wilson 2–3 Luca Brecel
 Barry Hawkins 3–2 Stuart Bingham
 Judd Trump 3–1 Kyren Wilson
 Luca Brecel 3–0 Jimmy Robertson
 Mark Selby 2–3 Stuart Bingham
 Barry Hawkins 3–1 Judd Trump
 Kyren Wilson 3–0 Jimmy Robertson
 Luca Brecel 3–2 Judd Trump
 Stuart Bingham 3–1 Jimmy Robertson
 Mark Selby 3–1 Luca Brecel
 Barry Hawkins 0–3 Kyren Wilson
 Stuart Bingham 3–1 Luca Brecel
 Judd Trump 3–1 Jimmy Robertson
 Mark Selby 3–1 Kyren Wilson
 Barry Hawkins 2–3 Jimmy Robertson
 Stuart Bingham 3–0 Kyren Wilson
 Barry Hawkins 3–0 Luca Brecel
 Mark Selby 3–1 Judd Trump

Table

Play-offs

Group 4 
Group 4 was played on 9 and 10 January 2019. Stuart Bingham was the fourth player to qualify for the Winners' Group.

Matches 

 Ryan Day 1–3 Ali Carter
 Graeme Dott 3–1 Luca Brecel
 Stuart Bingham 3–1 Ryan Day
 Mark Selby 3–1 Barry Hawkins
 Ali Carter 3–1 Graeme Dott
 Luca Brecel 0–3 Mark Selby
 Barry Hawkins 3–0 Stuart Bingham
 Ryan Day 3–2 Graeme Dott
 Ali Carter 1–3 Luca Brecel
 Mark Selby 3–2 Stuart Bingham
 Barry Hawkins 1–3 Luca Brecel
 Graeme Dott 3–2 Stuart Bingham
 Ryan Day 3–0 Barry Hawkins
 Ali Carter 3–1 Mark Selby
 Graeme Dott 1–3 Barry Hawkins
 Luca Brecel 0–3 Stuart Bingham
 Ryan Day 1–3 Mark Selby
 Ali Carter 1–3 Stuart Bingham
 Graeme Dott 0–3 Mark Selby
 Ali Carter 0–3 Barry Hawkins
 Ryan Day 2–3 Luca Brecel

Table

Play-offs

Group 5 
Group 5 was played on 21 and 22 January 2019. Mark Selby was the fifth player to qualify for the Winners' Group.

Matches 

 Stephen Maguire 3–0 Anthony McGill
 Joe Perry 2–3 David Gilbert
 Ali Carter 1–3 Stephen Maguire
 Barry Hawkins 3–0 Mark Selby
 Anthony McGill 3–2 Joe Perry
 David Gilbert 3–1 Barry Hawkins
 Mark Selby 3–0 Ali Carter
 Stephen Maguire 0–3 Joe Perry
 Anthony McGill 1–3 David Gilbert
 Barry Hawkins 1–3 Ali Carter
 Mark Selby 2–3 David Gilbert
 Joe Perry 1–3 Ali Carter
 Stephen Maguire 3–2 Mark Selby
 Anthony McGill 3–1 Barry Hawkins
 Joe Perry 0–3 Mark Selby
 David Gilbert 3–1 Ali Carter
 Stephen Maguire 2–3 Barry Hawkins
 Anthony McGill 2–3 Ali Carter
 Joe Perry 1–3 Barry Hawkins
 Anthony McGill 1–3 Mark Selby
 Stephen Maguire 3–1 David Gilbert

Note
Due to illness, Luca Brecel withdrew from the tournament prior to group 5 play. He was replaced in the group by David Gilbert.

Table

Play-offs

Group 6 
Group 6 was played on 23 and 24 January 2019. Martin Gould was the sixth player to qualify for the Winners' Group.

Matches 

 Xiao Guodong 0–3 Martin Gould 
 Mark Davis 3–0 Ali Carter
 David Gilbert 3–0 Xiao Guodong
 Stephen Maguire 3–1 Barry Hawkins
 Martin Gould 1–3 Mark Davis
 Ali Carter 2–3 Stephen Maguire
 Barry Hawkins 3–1 David Gilbert
 Xiao Guodong 2–3 Mark Davis
 Martin Gould 3–2 Ali Carter
 Stephen Maguire 3–2 David Gilbert
 Barry Hawkins 3–1 Ali Carter
 Mark Davis 1–3 David Gilbert
 Xiao Guodong 1–3 Barry Hawkins
 Martin Gould 3–0 Stephen Maguire
 Mark Davis 1–3 Barry Hawkins
 Ali Carter 3–2 David Gilbert
 Xiao Guodong 3–0 Stephen Maguire
 Martin Gould 3–0 David Gilbert
 Mark Davis 3–2 Stephen Maguire
 Martin Gould 0–3 Barry Hawkins
 Xiao Guodong 0–3 Ali Carter

Table

Play-offs

Group 7 
Group 7 was played on 11 and 12 March 2019. John Higgins was the seventh and final player to qualify for the Winners' Group.

Matches 

 John Higgins 3–0 Ding Junhui
 Michael White 0–3 Noppon Saengkham
 Stephen Maguire 0–3 John Higgins
 Mark Davis 3–2 Tom Ford
 Ding Junhui 3–2 Michael White
 Noppon Saengkham 3–1 Mark Davis
 Tom Ford 1–3 Stephen Maguire
 John Higgins 3–1 Michael White
 Ding Junhui 0–3 Noppon Saengkham
 Mark Davis 3–2 Stephen Maguire
 Tom Ford 2–3 Noppon Saengkham
 Michael White 2–3 Stephen Maguire
 John Higgins 3–0 Tom Ford
 Ding Junhui 3–1 Mark Davis
 Michael White 1–3 Tom Ford
 Noppon Saengkham 3–2 Stephen Maguire
 John Higgins 3–0 Mark Davis
 Ding Junhui 3–1 Stephen Maguire
 Michael White 3–1 Mark Davis
 Ding Junhui 3–1 Tom Ford
 John Higgins 3–1 Noppon Saengkham

Note
David Gilbert and Barry Hawkins withdrew from the tournament prior to group 7 play. They were replaced by Tom Ford and Noppon Saengkham.

Table

Play-offs

Winners' Group 
The Winners' Group was played on 13 and 14 March 2019. Martin Gould won his second Championship League title, beating Jack Lisowski 3–1 in the final. During the round robin matches, John Higgins made his 750th career century break. On the second day, Judd Trump made his 600th career century in his match against Martin Gould.

Matches 

 Neil Robertson 3–1 Jack Lisowski
 Judd Trump 3–1 Stuart Bingham
 Martin Gould 3–2 John Higgins
 Mark Selby 1–3 Neil Robertson
 Jack Lisowski 3–1 Judd Trump
 Stuart Bingham 1–3 Martin Gould
 John Higgins 3–2 Mark Selby
 Neil Robertson 1–3 Judd Trump
 Jack Lisowski 3–1 Stuart Bingham
 Martin Gould 0–3 Mark Selby
 John Higgins 1–3 Stuart Bingham
 Judd Trump 1–3 Mark Selby
 Neil Robertson 3–1 John Higgins
 Jack Lisowski 0–3 Martin Gould
 Judd Trump 0–3 John Higgins
 Stuart Bingham 1–3 Mark Selby
 Neil Robertson 0–3 Martin Gould
 Jack Lisowski 3–0 Mark Selby
 Judd Trump 3–0 Martin Gould
 Jack Lisowski 2–3 John Higgins
 Neil Robertson 3–1 Stuart Bingham

Table

Play-offs

Century breaks 
Total: 104

 147 (5), 105, 100, 100  David Gilbert
 143 (3), 143 (4), 143, 141, 139, 139, 135, 122,113, 113, 110, 109, 107, 103, 102, 100  Mark Selby
 143 (3), 132, 111, 106, 101, 100  Stuart Bingham
 142, 137, 136 (W), 127, 125, 115, 111,110, 109, 105, 105, 104, 103  Judd Trump
 141 (6), 134, 126, 125, 113, 105  Ali Carter
 139 (1), 128, 124, 120, 115, 110, 104  Neil Robertson
 135, 131, 117, 115, 105, 105  Martin Gould
 135, 129, 124, 116, 108, 105, 104, 103, 102  Stephen Maguire
 135, 127, 104, 102  Luca Brecel
 135  Joe Perry
 135  Ricky Walden
 134, 121, 120, 120, 105, 105, 101, 101  Barry Hawkins
 132 (2), 129, 123, 108  Kyren Wilson
 130 (7), 120, 118, 117, 117  John Higgins
 127  Tom Ford
 122  Graeme Dott
 121, 100  Ding Junhui
 120, 117  Jimmy Robertson
 117, 107, 103  Jack Lisowski
 112, 110  Noppon Saengkham
 112  Xiao Guodong
 110  Michael White
 104  Anthony McGill

Bold: highest break in the indicated group.

Winnings 

Green: won the group. Bold: highest break in the group. All prize money in GBP.
Parenthesis: World rankings prior to tournament start, 1 January 2019.
Notes
(1) Due to illness, Luca Brecel withdrew from the tournament prior to Group 5 play.
(2) Barry Hawkins and David Gilbert withdrew from the tournament prior to Group 7 play.

References

External links 
 http://www.championshipleaguesnooker.co.uk/
 http://livescores.worldsnookerdata.com/?year=2019&month=1 

2019
2019 in snooker
2019 in English sport
2019 Championship League
Sport in Barnsley
January 2019 sports events in the United Kingdom
February 2019 sports events in the United Kingdom
March 2019 sports events in the United Kingdom